Solon Mills is an unincorporated community and census-designated place in McHenry County, Illinois, United States. Solon Mills is part of ZIP code 60071; it once had its own post office with ZIP code 60080 before it closed on September 28, 2002. It was named a CDP before the 2020 census, at which time it had a population of 133.

Demographics

2020 census

References

Census-designated places in Illinois
Census-designated places in McHenry County, Illinois
Chicago metropolitan area